Sayyid Muhammad Rahim Bahadur II (1847–1910) was Khan of Khiva from 1864 to 1910, succeeding his father Sayyid Muhammad Khan. Khiva was turned into a Russian protectorate during his rule, in 1873.

The reign of Muhammad Rahim II marked the peak of a cultural revival, during which "more than a hundred works were translated, mostly from Persian into Chagatai Turkic." Muhammad Rahim II introduced printing to Khiva in 1874. He was also "a munificent patron" and wrote poetry under the pen name Feruz.

Excerpt from Ghazals
Below is one of Muhammad Rahim's ghazals in modern Uzbek Latin script:

References

Sources

Further reading
 

1847 births
1910 deaths
Khans of Khiva